The following is a list of adjectival forms of cities in English and their demonymic equivalents, which denote the people or the inhabitants of these cities.

Demonyms ending in -ese are the same in the singular and plural forms.

The ending -man has feminine equivalent -woman (e.g. an Irishman and a Scotswoman). The French terminations -ois / ais serve as both the singular and plural masculine; adding 'e' ( / ) makes them singular feminine; 'es' ( / ) makes them plural feminine. The Spanish termination "-o" usually denotes the masculine and is normally changed to feminine by dropping the "-o" and adding "-a". The plural forms are usually "-os" and "-as", respectively.

Adjectives ending -ish can be used as collective demonyms (e.g. the English, the Cornish). So can those ending in -ch / -tch (e.g. the French, the Dutch) provided they are pronounced with a 'ch'  sound (e.g. the adjective Czech does not qualify as its -ch is pronounced ).

Where an adjective is a link, the link is to the language or dialect of the same name.

Many place-name adjectives and many demonyms also refer to various other things, sometimes with and sometimes without one or more additional words. Additionally, sometimes the use of one or more additional words is optional. Notable examples are cheeses, cat breeds, dog breeds, and horse breeds.

Note: Many of these adjectivals and demonyms are not used in English as frequently as their counterparts in other languages. A common practice is to use a city's name as if it were an adjective, as in "Vienna Philharmonic Orchestra", "Melbourne suburbs", etc.

Table

See also

 Demonym
 List of adjectival and demonymic forms of place names
 List of adjectivals and demonyms for astronomical bodies
 List of adjectivals and demonyms for continental regions
 List of adjectivals and demonyms for subcontinental regions
 List of adjectival and demonymic forms for countries and nations
 List of adjectivals and demonyms for Australia
 List of adjectivals and demonyms for Canada
 List of adjectivals and demonyms for India
 List of adjectivals and demonyms for Malaysia
 List of adjectivals and demonyms for Mexico
 List of adjectivals and demonyms for New Zealand
 List of adjectivals and demonyms for the Philippines
 List of adjectivals and demonyms for the United States
 List of adjectivals and demonyms for cities
 List of adjectivals and demonyms for Colorado cities
 List of adjectivals and demonyms for former regions
 List of adjectivals and demonyms for Greco-Roman antiquity
 List of adjectivals and demonyms for fictional regions
 Lists of city nicknames

References

Cities